The K XI class was a class of three submarines, built by Fijenoord shipyard in Rotterdam for the Royal Netherlands Navy. Used for patrols in the Dutch colonial waters. All ships were still in service at the start of World War II. K XIII was scuttled while under repair at Soerabaja to prevent her being captured by the invading Japanese forces.

Construction

External links
Description of class 

Submarines of the Netherlands